Justin Quek (郭文秀, pinyin: Guō Wénxìu; born on 30 March 1962 in Singapore) is a Singaporean chef based in Singapore. His specialty is in Franco-Asian cuisine. He is Singapore's most internationally known chef and the first Asian chef invited to participate in Lufthansa's Star Chefs program.

Biography
Quek is Teochew and his family business in the past was a fruit stall in Queen Street. His father died when he was seven. He has 11 other siblings and he attended Broadrick Secondary School.

Quek had always wanted to travel. After his National Service in Singapore, at 20 years old, he got a job as a steward. It was after two years as a seaman that led him to his passion of cooking.

He then went on to learn the basics of cooking at the Singapore Hotel and Tourism Education Center (SHATEC) for one year. After his graduation in 1986, Quek continued his culinary training at The Oriental's hotels in Bangkok and Singapore under chef Bertrand Langlet, who encouraged him to go to France to further his training.
In 1991, Quek used his life savings of $40,000 to travel to France to greatly improve his skills.

He returned to Singapore in 1992, taking the place of personal chef at the French Embassy, serving two high commissioners.

Quek then joined Les Amis at Shaw House, Singapore. In 2004, he left Les Amis to establish a new restaurant called La Petite Cuisine in Taipei. He has since opened another French eatery La Platane, a fine-dining Chinese restaurant Villa du Lac and a restaurant named Fountain. All three are located at Xintiandi, Shanghai. He sold all businesses in Shanghai in January 2009. Opened Just In Bistro & Wine Bar, Taipei in April 2009, and fine-dining French restaurant Justin's Signatures in Dec 2009. Sold all business in Taipei in 2013. Quek was also a consultant to Whisk, The Mira Hong Kong and The French Window, IFC Hong Kong.

In 2010, Quek returned to Singapore and opened the "Sky On 57" at Marina Bay Sands, Singapore. The restaurant showcases an array of Franco-Asian cuisine, and offers a view of the Singapore skyline.

Drink Driving
In June 2010, Quek was jailed for two weeks, fined S$6,300 for drink driving and banned from driving all vehicles for four years. Further investigation revealed that Quek was driving without a licence and proper insurance coverage. He was also convicted of drink driving in 2005.

Awards
 In 2001, Quek was awarded the title of Best Chef of the Year at the inaugural World Gourmet Summit (WGS) Awards.
 In 2003 and 2004, Quek won the title of San Pellegrino Chef of the Year.
 In 2004, Quek received the Lifetime Achievement Award at the 8th Annual New World Food and Wine Festival.
 In 2005, Quek received the At-Sunrice GlobalChef Award.
 In 2009, Quek received World Gourmet Summit Award of Excellence Hall of Fame Best chef.

References

1962 births
Singaporean people of Teochew descent
Living people
Singaporean chefs
Chefs of French cuisine
Singaporean people of Chinese descent